United States v. Williams, 341 U.S. 70 (1951), is a decision by the United States Supreme Court that provides that  (protecting US citizens' Fourteenth Amendment rights from individuals sworn to uphold laws) may be applied only to federal cases and is not available to state governments.

Background
Jay G. Williams was employed by a Florida detective agency. In 1947, the agency was hired by a Florida company to investigate thefts occurring on the company's property. Williams was the head of the detective agency. Williams, two other employees of the detective agency, and a member of the Miami police force participated in the investigation. As some of the company's employees became suspects, Williams and his collaborators, without arresting the suspects, took them one by one to an isolated building on the company's premises. There, the investigators subjected them to intense interrogations, which, "after blows, kicks, threats, and prolonged exposure to a brilliant light," yielded a confession.

The conduct of the detective agency fell outside of the scope of activities permitted by Florida law. Thus, Williams and his accomplices were arrested and charged with a federal crime, 18 USC §§ 241, prohibiting willfully, under color of the laws, statutes, ordinances, regulations and customs of the State of Florida subjecting an inhabitant of the State of Florida, to deprivation of the rights, privileges and immunities secured to him and protected by the Fourteenth Amendment.

18 USC §§ 241 originated with the Enforcement Act of 1870, which enforced the "Right of Citizens of the United States to vote in the several States of this Union, and for other Purposes." In furtherance of its chief end of assuring the right of African Americans to vote, it provided that it should be a misdemeanor for any "person or officer" to fail wrongfully in a duty imposed on him by state law to perform or permit performance of acts necessary to registering or voting. In the course of passage through Congress, several sections were added, which had a larger purpose. One of them, derived from the Civil Rights Act of 1866, designed to "secure to all persons the equal protection of the laws."

Decision
In a narrow 5-4 vote, the Supreme Court determined that 18 USC §§ 241 was instituted by the federal courts to prohibit only officers of the federal government from violating constitutional rights. It was determined that the statute did not cover state officers who violate the state rights of citizens. Therefore, it was determined that the federal court did not have jurisdiction to prosecute Williams under 18 USC §§ 241 because he was under commission by the State of Florida, not by the US government.

References

External links
 

1951 in United States case law
Civil rights movement case law
United States Supreme Court cases
United States Supreme Court cases of the Vinson Court